Manuel Francisco dos Santos (28 October 1933 – 20 January 1983), nicknamed Mané Garrincha, best known as simply Garrincha ("little bird"), was a Brazilian professional footballer who played as a right winger. He is widely regarded as one of the greatest players of all time, and by some, one of the greatest dribblers ever.

Garrincha played a vital role in Brazil's 1958 and 1962 World Cup victories. In 1962, when Pelé got injured, Garrincha led Brazil to a World Cup victory with a dominating performance throughout the tournament. He also became the first player to win the Golden Ball (Player of the tournament), Golden Boot (Leading Goalscorer) and the World Cup in the same tournament. He was also named in the World Cup All-Star Teams of both 1958 World Cup and 1962 World Cup. In 1994, he was named in the FIFA World Cup All-Time Team. Brazil never lost a match while fielding both Garrincha and Pelé. In 1999, he came seventh in the FIFA Player of the Century grand jury vote. He is a member of the World Team of the 20th Century, and was inducted into the Brazilian Football Hall of Fame. Due to his immense popularity in Brazil, he was also called Alegria do Povo (People's Joy) and Anjo de Pernas Tortas (Bent-Legged Angel).

At the club level, Garrincha played the majority of his professional career for the Brazilian team Botafogo. In the Maracanã Stadium, the home team room is known as "Garrincha". In the capital Brasília, the Estádio Nacional Mané Garrincha is named after him. He is credited for inspiring the first bullfighting chants of olé to be used at football grounds.

Early life 

Garrincha was born in Pau Grande, a district of Magé, in the state of Rio de Janeiro, in 1933. He was born with his right leg 6 centimetres shorter than his left, also his left leg turned outwards and his right turned inwards, leading one doctor to certify him as crippled as a child.

His father was an alcoholic, drinking cachaça heavily, a problem which Garrincha would inherit. A boy with a carefree attitude, he was smaller than other kids his age, with his sister Rosa noticing he was as small as a little bird she started calling him Garrincha, the north-eastern name for the wren, a little brown bird. The name stuck and by the age of four years he was known as Garrincha to his family and friends. Garrincha was also known as Mané (short for Manuel) by his friends. The combined Mané Garrincha is common among fans in Brazil.

Garrincha was known amongst footballing scouts but did not arrive in professional football until his late teens; he had no interest in a professional career despite his immense talent. 
 
Garrincha's younger brother, Jimmy dos Santos, played 20 games for Série A side CR Vasco da Gama in 1959.

Club career 

Garrincha was already married and a parent when he signed for Botafogo in 1953. Team officials were ecstatic to learn that he was over 18 and able to be treated as a professional. In his first training session, he demonstrated his extraordinary skills by dribbling the ball through the legs of Nílton Santos, a Brazilian international defender and defensive midfielder who had 16 international caps. Santos was so impressed with the young Garrincha, he asked that Botafogo sign him. He played in a 5–0 win for Botafogo's reserves and then scored a hat trick on his first-team début against Bonsucesso on 19 July 1953.

Garrincha continued to play brilliantly, but Brazil had other talented players in his position, notably Julinho and together with a new European style of play centered on teamwork, he was not named in the squad for the 1954 World Cup. He helped Botafogo win the Campeonato Carioca in 1957 by scoring 20 goals in 26 games finishing second in the league scoring charts and this convinced the national team selectors to name him to the 1958 World Cup squad. After the 1962 World Cup, Garrincha returned to Rio and carried Botafogo to victory in the 1962 Campeonato Carioca final against Flamengo. Garrincha played for Botafogo for 12 years, the bulk of his professional career. He won the Campeonato Carioca three times with them, scored 232 goals in 581 matches, and became a symbol of the history of the club.

In 1966, with his career declining, he was sold to Corinthians. Two years later, he signed for Colombian team Atlético Junior. The same year he went back to Brazil and joined Flamengo, where he would stay until 1969. In 1971, there were rumours that Garrincha, 38, would join French club Red Star, but he never signed and stayed in Brazil.

An entertainer renowned for his dribbling skills in taking on opposing players, Garrincha inspiring the first bullfighting chants of olé to be used at football grounds; during a 1958 club game for Botafogo he gave a footballing lesson to River Plate defender Vairo, constantly teasing, feinting and going past him to ole's from the crowd, and when he "forgot" the ball and sprinted away with Vairo running after him the chants of olés changed to laughter. Garrincha's professional career as a footballer lasted until 1972, when he played for Olaria, but he played occasional exhibition matches until 1982.

Garrincha was subject to numerous transfer attempts by rich European clubs like Juventus of Turin, Italy who tried to sign him in 1954. Real Madrid of Spain tried to sign him in 1959 after some stunning performances by him on a tour of Europe. Internazionale, AC Milan and Juventus of Italy considered jointly signing him in 1963 (he would have to spend a season with each); a deal that would have been unique in football.

International career 
Garrincha played 50 international matches for Brazil between 1955 and 1966, and was a starter for the national team in the 1958, 1962 and 1966 World Cups. Brazil lost only one match with him on the pitch, against Hungary at the 1966 World Cup. This was the last time Garrincha played in National team. Pelé did not play the game against Hungary, and thus Brazil never lost when Garrincha and Pelé were in the same lineup.

His first cap was against Chile in Rio de Janeiro in 1955. He played two matches at the Copa América of 1957 and four in the 1959 edition, Brazil finished runners up in both editions.

1958 World Cup 

On 29 May, ten days before the 1958 World Cup finals started, Garrincha scored one of his most famous goals, against Fiorentina in Italy. He beat four defenders and the goalkeeper, before stopping on the goal line. Rather than kicking the ball into the open goal, he then dribbled past the returning Enzo Robotti to score. Despite his stunning performance his coaches were upset at what they considered an irresponsible move and this likely led to Garrincha not being picked for Brazil's first two matches of the 1958 tournament. However, he did start their third match against the USSR; this match marked the debut of both Garrincha and Pelé (although Garrincha was seven years older than Pele, both being born in October, respectively in 1933 and in 1940). The Soviets were one of the favourites for the tournament, and the Brazilians had been nervous about playing them.  Their manager, Vicente Feola, decided to attack directly from the kickoff. Garrincha received the ball on the right wing, beat three opposing players and took a shot which hit the post. With the match still less than a minute old, he set up a chance for Pelé, who hit the crossbar, and continually caused problems for the Soviet defence. Brazil were so impressive in the opening moments that the game's start is often referred to as "the best three minutes of football of all time".  Brazil won the match 2–0.

Following the Brazilians' narrow 1–0 quarter-final win against Wales on 19 June 1958, Mel Hopkins (the fullback who faced him that game) described Garrincha as "a phenomenon, capable of sheer magic. It was difficult to know which way he was going to go because of his legs and because he was as comfortable on his left foot as his right, so he could cut inside or go down the line and he had a ferocious shot too."

In the final against Sweden, Brazil fell behind 0–1 early, but rapidly equalized after Garrincha went past his marker on the right wing and sent a cross for Vavá to score. Before the end of the first half, Garrincha made a similar play, again setting up Vavá to make the score 2–1. Brazil ended winning the match and its first World Cup trophy, with Garrincha being one of the best players of the tournament; he was voted to the "Best XI" for the competition.

Garrincha never bothered about the 'details' of the game. As his teammates were celebrating the World Cup win, he was initially bemused, having been under the impression that the competition was more league-like and that Brazil would play all the other teams twice.

1958–1962 
Garrincha put on weight after the World Cup, partly because of his drinking, so he was dropped from the national team for a friendly match in Rio against England on 13 May 1959. Later that month, he went on tour with Botafogo in Sweden and got a local girl pregnant. When he returned to Brazil, he drove home to Pau Grande and ran over his father, Amaro. He drove off without stopping, with an angry mob chasing him, and when they caught up with him they found him "drunk, almost catatonic, and with no grasp of what he had done." In August, his wife, Nair, gave birth to their fifth child, and his mistress Iraci announced her first pregnancy. His father died of liver cancer on 10 October having been dependent on alcohol for years.

1962 World Cup 

Garrincha was the most outstanding player of the 1962 FIFA World Cup. When Pelé suffered an injury after the second match and was sidelined for the rest of the tournament, Garrincha played a leading role in Brazil's triumph, excelling particularly against England and Chile, scoring 4 goals in those two matches.

After one win and one draw, Brazil faced Spain, without Pelé. The South Americans were losing 0–1 in the second half. Amarildo, Pelé's substitute for the remainder of the tournament, scored the equalizer. Five minutes before the end, Garrincha took the ball on the right flank, dribbled past a defender and paused. Then he dribbled past the same man and another defender, and sent a cross to Amarildo, who scored again to win the match.

In the quarter-finals against England, Garrincha opened the score with a header off a corner kick. England equalized before half time. In the second half, Vavá scored Brazil's second goal off a rebound of a shot by Garrincha; minutes later, Garrincha received a ball outside the penalty area, paused, and sent a curved shot – known as the "banana shot" – into the bottom of the net. Brazil won 3–1 and advanced to the semi-finals. The British football press said he "was Stanley Matthews, Tom Finney and a snake charmer all rolled into one."

During the quarter final, a stray dog ran onto the pitch and evaded all of the players' efforts to catch it until England striker Jimmy Greaves got down on all fours to beckon the animal. Though successful in catching the dog, it managed to urinate all over Greaves' England shirt. Greaves claimed that Garrincha thought the incident was so amusing that he took the dog home as a pet. Ruy Castro's book expands upon this, by clarifying that the dog was captured by an official, and raffled off to the Brazilian squad, a raffle which Garrincha won. The dog was named "Bi" (from "bi-campeões" - "two times champions").

He scored two more goals in the semi-final against the hosts, Chile, as Brazil went on to win 4–2. His first goal was a 20-yard left-foot shot; the second one, a header. A subsequent headline in the Chilean newspaper El Mercurio read: "What planet is Garrincha from?" Garrincha was sent off in that match after 83 minutes for retaliating after being continually fouled. However, he was not suspended for the following match.

Brazil faced Czechoslovakia in the final. Garrincha played despite suffering from a severe fever, which did not prevent Brazil from winning 3–1 and him from getting voted player of the tournament. It was the second consecutive World Cup won by Garrincha and Brazil.

1966 World Cup 
Though well short of match fitness and still struggling with a knee injury, which would plague him for the rest of his career, Garrincha still played in the first match of the tournament, a 2–0 win against Bulgaria, Garrincha scored one of the goals of this game with a free kick taken with the outside of his foot (the second goal of this game was scored by Pelé - this was the only time when Garrincha and Pelé both scored goals in the same game). Then Brazil lost 1–3 to Hungary at Goodison Park, in Garrincha's last ever international match, which was the only time Garrincha lost a match with the Brazil national team; he did not play in the last match of the first round against Portugal. Brazil were eliminated in the first round.

Retirement from professional football and farewell 

In 1973, although he was still signed by Olaria, Garrincha decided to leave professional football. Apart from his age (he was almost 40), "there was another reason for wanting to retire: he had become a grandfather for the first time – his daughter Edenir had just given birth to Alexandra – and being a professional football player and a grandfather felt weird." Alexandra with her three children still live in Garrincha's house in Pau Grande.
 
On 19 December 1973, a farewell match for Garrincha between a FIFA World team and Brazil was celebrated at the Maracanã Stadium in Rio de Janeiro, in front of 131,000 spectators. The FIFA team was composed mainly of Argentine and Uruguayan players, while Brazil fielded Pelé, Carlos Alberto, and several other members of the 1970 World Cup winning squad. Garrincha started the match, and while in the first half, at a point when Brazil had the ball in attack, the referee stopped the match so Garrincha could leave the pitch and receive the crowd's respects. Garrincha then did a lap around the pitch before disappearing through the stadium's tunnel.

Final years and death 

The success Garrincha enjoyed on the football pitch was in stark contrast to his personal life. He drank heavily throughout his adult life and was involved in several serious road accidents, notably a crash into a lorry in April 1969 which killed his mother-in-law. He was married twice, first to Nair Marques in 1952 (they separated in 1965), a factory worker from Pau Grande with whom he had eight daughters, and second to Elza Soares, a samba singer whom he married in an unofficial ceremony in March 1966. Soares had also been married previously, and the marriage saw Garrincha cast as a villain by the same press that had once feted him. The couple separated in 1977, when Soares left him after he struck her during an argument. Garrincha had other significant affairs, including one with showgirl Angelita Martinez, and he is known to have fathered at least 14 children.

After a series of financial and marital problems, Garrincha died of cirrhosis of the liver on 20 January 1983, in an alcoholic coma in Rio de Janeiro. He had been hospitalized eight times in the previous year, and by the time of his death he was a physical and mental wreck. His last years were unhappy and obscure – he seemed to have become a forgotten hero – but his funeral procession, from the Maracanã to Pau Grande, drew millions of fans, friends and former players to pay their respects. His epitaph reads "Here rests in peace the one who was the Joy of the People – Mané Garrincha." People had painted on the wall: Obrigado, Garrincha, por você ter vivido (Thank you, Garrincha, for having lived).

A multi-use stadium in Brasilia, the Estádio Nacional Mané Garrincha, is named after him. His career was presented in the 1962 film Garrincha, Alegria do Povo, and in 2003, another movie, called Garrincha – Estrela Solitária ("Lonely Star"), based on Ruy Castro's book, depicted his life on and off the field.

Style of play 

An explosive, agile, and diminutive right winger with a low centre of gravity, Garrincha is renowned for his creativity, pace, and speed of execution, as well as his remarkable ball control, technique, flair, imagination, dribbling skills and feints on the wing, which enabled him to create chances out of nothing. Capable of both scoring goals and creating chances for teammates, he also possessed a powerful shot with either foot and was a gifted crosser and set piece specialist known for his bending free kicks and corners taken with the outside of his foot. However, it was his dribbling skills he was most famous for, a skill he retained throughout his career. Regarding Garrincha's dribbling ability, football writer Scott Murray remarked when writing for The Guardian in 2010: "...the bottom line is uncontestable: Garrincha was the greatest dribbler ever."

Adored by the Brazilian public due to his innocence, carefree attitude and ability to entertain in making fools of opposing players, Garrincha was referred to as "Joy of the People". Djalma Santos, his Brazil teammate, stated, "He had a childish spirit. Garrincha was football's answer to Charlie Chaplin."

Examples of his shooting ability are his goals in World Cups against England in 1962 and Bulgaria in 1966. He was also able to turn on himself at top speed and explode at unusual angles, which he used to great effect. The numerous attacks and goal opportunities he generated through individual plays would often end up in an accurate pass to a teammate in a position to score. This occurred in the first two of Brazil's goals in the 1958 World Cup final and the second goal against Spain in the 1962 tournament. He was also an excellent header of the ball despite his relatively short stature. He is one of a few players to have scored direct from a corner, a feat he managed to do 4 times in his career.

Regarded as one of the greatest players of all time, he was voted into the World Team of the 20th Century by 250 of the world's most respected football writers and journalists, came seventh in the FIFA Player of the Century grand jury vote, and was named in the FIFA World Cup All-Time Team.

Career statistics

Club

International

Honours 
Botafogo
 International Quadrangular Tournament: 1954
 State Championship: 1957, 1961, 1962
 Interclub Tournament Pentagonal Mexico: 1958
 International Tournament of Colombia: 1960
 International Tournament in Costa Rica: 1961
 Tournament Home: 1961, 1962 and 1963
 Pentagonal the International Club of México: 1962
 Interstate Cup Champions Club: 1962
 Rio-São Paulo Tournament: 1962 and 1964
 World Champion Clubs (Paris Intercontinental Championship): 1963
 Golden Jubilee Tournament Football Association of La Paz: 1964
 Ibero-American Tournament: 1964
 Panamaribo Cup: 1964

Corinthians
 (Rio-São Paulo Tournament) 1966

Brazil
 FIFA World Cup: 1958, 1962
 O'Higgins Cup: 1955, 1959, 1961
 Oswaldo Cruz Cup: 1961

Individual
 FIFA World Cup Golden Ball: 1962
 FIFA World Cup Golden Boot: 1962
 FIFA World Cup All-Star Team: 1958, 1962
 Brazilian Championship Best Player: 1962
 Rio-São Paulo Tournament Best Player: 1962
 Interstate Club Champions Cup Best Player: 1962
 Carioca Championship Best Player: 1957, 1961, 1962
 World Soccer World XI: 1962
 Brazilian Football Museum Hall of Fame
 World Team of the 20th Century.
 FIFA World Cup All-Time Team inductee
 World Soccer's Greatest Players of the 20th century (1999): #20
 L'Équipe's top 50 South-American footballers in history: #4
 IFFHS Brazilian Player of the 20th Century (2nd place)
 IFFHS South American Player of the 20th Century (4th place)
 IFFHS World Player of the 20th Century (8th place)
 The Best of The Best – Player of the Century: Top 50
 Ballon d'Or: 1962 - Le nouveau palmarès (the new winners)
 IFFHS Legends
 Ballon d'Or Dream Team (Silver): 2020

Bibliography 
  Original in Portuguese: Estrela Solitária (Lonely Star), 1995

References

External links 

 The Cachaça Supernova – In Defense of Football's Prophet of Absurdism, Mané Garrincha - Football Paradise
 Sporting Mavericks Hall of Fame Entry
 Brazilian Football Museum Hall of Fame
 
 Detail of international appearances and goals by RSSSF
 Profile at the International Football Hall of Fame
 ABC (Australia)
 BBC biography
 
 
 BBC Documentary video,  and 

1933 births
1983 deaths
Brazilian footballers
Association football forwards
Association football wingers
Serrano Football Club players
Botafogo de Futebol e Regatas players
Sport Club Corinthians Paulista players
CR Flamengo footballers
Atlético Junior footballers
Olaria Atlético Clube players
Campeonato Brasileiro Série A players
Categoría Primera A players
Brazil international footballers
1958 FIFA World Cup players
1962 FIFA World Cup players
1966 FIFA World Cup players
FIFA World Cup-winning players
Brazilian expatriate footballers
Brazilian expatriate sportspeople in Colombia
Expatriate footballers in Colombia
Deaths from cirrhosis
Alcohol-related deaths in Brazil
Afro-Brazilian sportspeople
Sportspeople from Rio de Janeiro (state)